Eurydice is a genus of isopod crustaceans named after the mythical Eurydice, wife of the musician Orpheus. It includes the following species:

Eurydice acuticauda Bruce, 1981
Eurydice affinis Hansen, 1905
Eurydice agilis Jones, 1971
Eurydice akiyamai Nunomura, 1981
Eurydice arabica Jones, 1974
Eurydice barnardi Bruce & Soares, 1996
Eurydice binda Bruce, 1986
Eurydice bowmani George & Longerbeam, 1998
Eurydice caudata Richardson, 1899
Eurydice cavicaudata Jones, 1971
Eurydice chelifer Jones, 1971
Eurydice clymeneia Monod, 1926
Eurydice convexa Richardson, 1900
Eurydice czerniavsky Bacescu, 1948
Eurydice dollfusi Monod, 1930
Eurydice elongata Moreira, 1972
Eurydice emarginata Moreira, 1972
Eurydice grimaldii Dollfus, 1888
Eurydice humilis Stebbing, 1910
Eurydice indicis Eleftheriou & Jones, 1976
Eurydice inermis Hansen, 1890
Eurydice inornata Jones, 1971
Eurydice kensleyi Bruce & Soares, 1996
Eurydice littoralis (Moore, 1901)
Eurydice longiantennata Nunomura & Ikehara, 1985
Eurydice longicornis (Studer)
Eurydice longipes Jones, 1971
Eurydice longispina Jones, 1969
Eurydice lusitanica Jones & Pierpoint, 1997
Eurydice mauritanica de Grave & Jones, 1991
Eurydice minya Bruce, 1986
Eurydice naylori Jones & Pierpoint, 1997
Eurydice nipponica Bruce & Jones, 1981
Eurydice orientalis Hansen, 1890
Eurydice paxilli Schotte & Kensley, 2005
Eurydice peraticis Jones, 1974
Eurydice personata Kensley, 1987
Eurydice piperata Menzies & Frankenberg, 1966
Eurydice pontica (Czerniavsky, 1868)
Eurydice pulchra Leach, 1815
Eurydice racovitzai Bacescu, 1949
Eurydice rotundicauda Norman, 1906
Eurydice saikaiensis Nunomura, 2008
Eurydice spenceri Bruce, 1981B
Eurydice spinigera Hansen, 1890
Eurydice subtruncata Tattersall, 1921
Eurydice tarti Bruce, 1986
Eurydice truncata (Norman, 1868)
Eurydice valkanovi Bacescu, 1949
Eurydice woka Bruce, 1986
Eurydice wyuna Bruce, 1986

References

Cymothoida
Isopod genera
Taxa named by William Elford Leach